Fung Chin Pang (Chinese: 馮展鵬, born 11 September 1981) is a comic artist and illustrator from Hong Kong.

His work include the manhua series Confidential Assassination Troop, which is about the approach of World War Three and the communications war which proceeds it. It was first published by Tong Li Comics in 2003 and has been released in Hong Kong, Taiwan, Italy, France and Russia. He also done various illustrations for the novel series, Lie Sha Tian Chou Xiao Shuo (猎杀天雠).

He is the illustrator for the PC game Soul Origin from Valhalla Entertainment.

External links
 Official site
 Official artbook blog site
 Fung Chin Pang's deviantART site
 Fung Chin Pang on tut-art.ru

Hong Kong comics artists
Living people
1981 births